Amal Amjahid (born 28 October 1995) is a Belgian ground grappler who represents her home country Belgium in Sport Jujitsu (JJIF), discipline Ne-waza and different professional teams (fighting clubs) in Brazilian Jiu-Jitsu (IBJJF, UAEJJF).

Career 
She begun with sport jujitsu at age of 7 in Brussels. Her family is originally from Morocco. She is practising ground variant of ju-jitsu – Brazilian Jiu-Jitsu at CENS Academy under supervision of her personal coach and stepfather Khalid Houry. She is winner of World Games in Wrocław from 2017 and five times individual world champion (JJIF) – 2015, 2016, 2017, 2018, 2019 in discipline Ne-waza (Brazilian Jiu-Jitsu).

She is also participate at pro level tournaments which many times use title World (European) Championships but are regulated by private profite sport bodies – IBJJF or UAEJJF. She gained black belt in 2019. As black belt she is winner of European IBJJF Jiu-Jitsu Championship in 2019 as member of pro team Pat Academy BJJ.

Results

References

External links
 

1995 births
Living people
Belgian jujutsuka
Belgian practitioners of Brazilian jiu-jitsu
World Games gold medalists
Competitors at the 2017 World Games